The Mt. Olive Road Covered Bridge is a historic covered bridge in Vinton County, Ohio, United States.  Located northeast of Allensville, the bridge carries Mt. Olive Road through a valley in northwestern Vinton County.  In the earliest days of white settlement of southern Ohio, the Mt. Olive Road was a major transportation artery; until about 1825, it was heavily used by travellers between Marietta and Chillicothe.

Built on stone piers and covered with a metal roof, the Mt. Olive Road Bridge is supported by a simple queen post truss design.  Its builder was local engineer George Washington Pilcher; a leading engineer in southeastern Ohio, Pilcher helped to build many other Vinton County covered bridges and contributed toward the construction of Manasseh Cutler Hall on the campus of Ohio University.

When the bridge was built, it lay amid land owned by a family named "Grandstaff"; because this family owned wide lands surrounding the bridge, it has also frequently been known as the "Grandstaff Bridge."  Nevertheless, the name "Mt. Olive Road Bridge" persists; when it was named a historic site in 1973, the designation was made under that name.  This designation was that of placement on the National Register of Historic Places, an honor shared by two other Vinton County covered bridges.  It qualified for this distinction both because of its well-preserved historic engineering and because of its contribution to statewide history.

References

External links

Covered bridges on the National Register of Historic Places in Ohio
Buildings and structures in Vinton County, Ohio
National Register of Historic Places in Vinton County, Ohio
Bridges completed in 1875
Transportation in Vinton County, Ohio
Tourist attractions in Vinton County, Ohio
Road bridges on the National Register of Historic Places in Ohio
Wooden bridges in Ohio
Queen post truss bridges in the United States